Country Code: +506

International Call Prefix: 00

Number plan type: closed

As of 2010 the government body in charge of allocations is the Superintendencia de Telecomunicaciones SUTEL.

History of allocations
Prefix 00 was reserved for international calls, while prefix 9 was assigned to special numbers, such as 9-1-1. Toll-free numbers start with 800 followed by 7 digits while premium-rate numbers start with 900 followed by 7 digits.

Before 1994, all phone numbers in Costa Rica were six digits long. The Instituto Costarricense de Electricidad, which at that time had the monopoly on telecommunications, introduced a system in which the telephone numbers in every province were assigned a prefix to make them 7 digits long.
This numbering system was effective for some time. However, the boom of mobile phone customers since the introduction of GSM around 2000 and the expansion of metropolitan areas caused a serious shortage of available numbers. Thus many GSM-based customers used numbers starting with 3 and many residents of San Jose province had telephone numbers starting with prefixes other than 2.

Since March 20, 2008, a renewed numbering system added the prefix 2 for all landlines and 8 for all mobile phone numbers. This system was implemented in order to face the introduction of 1.5 million 3G W-CDMA customers in Q1 2009. The transition to 8-digit numbers was heavily publicized in Costa Rican media. However, the change caused considerable confusion among foreigners. Also, all calls dialed using the old 7-digit version of the phone number are automatically redirected to a voice message with information about the change.

In 2010, after the end of the government monopoly in telecommunications, prefixes 3, 4, 5, 6 and 7 were assigned to private operators.

8-digit numbers are commonly written one of two ways: "xxxxxxxx" or "xxxx-xxxx"

Current Costa Rica number plan

Special Costa Rica numbers

References

Sources
SUTEL Registro de Numeración  (In Spanish)
SUTEL Plan Nacional de Numeración (In Spanish)

External links
800 Toll Free Numbers Costa Rica - Phonebook Database

Costa Rica
Costa Rica communications-related lists
Telecommunications in Costa Rica